Sofie Laguna (born 1968) is an Australian writer.  She was born in Sydney and studied law before deciding that being a lawyer was not for her. She has worked as an actor and is now a writer and playwright. She now lives in Melbourne.

Awards 
 2003 honour book Children's Book of the Year Award: Early Childhood for Too Loud Lily
 2007 honour book Children's Book of the Year Award: Younger Readers for Bird and Sugar Boy
 2009 longlisted Miles Franklin Award for One Foot Wrong
 2009 shortlisted Prime Minister's Literary Awards for One Foot Wrong
 2015 shortlisted Stella Prize for The Eye of the Sheep
 2015 winner Miles Franklin Award for The Eye of the Sheep
 2015 commended The Fellowship of Australian Writers Victoria Inc. National Literary Awards — FAW Christina Stead Award for The Eye of the Sheep
 2018 longlisted Stella Prize for The Choke
 2018 shortlisted Voss Literary Prize for The Choke
2021 longlisted Miles Franklin Award for Infinite Splendours
2021 winner Colin Roderick Award for Infinite Splendours

Bibliography

Novels
 One Foot Wrong (2008)
 The Eye of the Sheep (2014)
 The Choke (2017)
Infinite Splendours (2020)

Children's
 Bill's Best Day (2002)
 Bad Buster (2003)
 Surviving Aunt Marsha (2003)
 Big Ned's Bushwalk (2005)
 Bird and Sugar Boy (2006)
 Meet Grace (2011)
 A Friend for Grace (2011)
 Grace and Glory (2011)
 A Home for Grace (2011) 
 The Grace Stories (2013)
 1836 : Do You Dare? : Fighting Bones (2014)

Picture books

 My Yellow Blanky (2002) with Tom Jellett (illustrator)
 Too Loud Lily (2002) with Kerry Argent (illustrator)
 On Our Way to the Beach (2004) with Andrew McLean (illustrator)
 Stephen's Music (2007) with Anna Pignataro (illustrator)
 Boris Monster, Scared of Nothing (2007) with Ben Redlich (illustrator)
 Where Are You, Banana? (2013) with Craig Smith (illustrator)

Personal life
Laguna lives in Eltham in suburban Melbourne with her partner Marc McBride, an illustrator, and their two sons.

References

External links

 Author's website

1968 births
Living people
21st-century Australian novelists
Australian women novelists
Miles Franklin Award winners
21st-century Australian women writers